St. Martin of Tours Church is a Roman Catholic parish of the Diocese of Basse-Terre located on rue du Fort Louis in the city of Marigot, St. Martin in the Lesser Antilles.

The church was built in 1941. In 1971 the church was expanded and a chapel was added.

It is under the pastoral responsibility of Fr. Père Samson Doriva. As its name suggests it is dedicated to St. Martin of Tours a Catholic bishop of Tours in France elevated to the status of saint by the Holy See.

See also
Catholic Church in France
Saint Martin

References

Roman Catholic churches in the Collectivity of Saint Martin
Marigot, Saint Martin
Roman Catholic churches completed in 1941
20th-century Roman Catholic church buildings in France